Daler Nazarov (born September 8, 1959) is a Tajik singer, composer and actor of Pamiri origin.

Biography 

Daler Nazarov was born in the Former Soviet Republic of Tajikistan. In the late 1970s, he created "Daler Nazarov's Band" which primarily focused on the rock genre and made him and his band popular. To his many fans, Daler Nazarov's band was regarded as the "Beatles" of Tajikistan. His songs "Agar on turki sherozi", "Zebo ba Zebo", "Chashmi kabudi dudi", "Chak-chaki boron", Dunyoi savdo bigzarad", "Hargiz az yod", "Nigori nozanin", "Bo perahani yosuman", "Telefoni sulh" were instant hits of the 1980s in the former Soviet Republic of Tajikistan, Uzbekistan and Kazakhstan.

In 2008, the Tajik newspaper Avesta included Nazarov in the list of the hundred richest and most influential people in the country.

In 1988, Muboraksho Mirzoshoyev joined his group and the duo collaborated for several years under "Daler Nazarov"s band. His band included the best musicians of the time, Muboraksho Mirzoshoyev, Ikbolsho Zavkibekov, Yadidya Ilyaev, Anvarhso Ghulomhaydarov, Firuz Khalilov, Daler Khalilov, Rustam Rahimov, and Zarif Pulatov. He has lived in Dushanbe, the capital of Tajikistan for most of his life, but had to leave the country in the early 1990s due to a civil war that ended around 1997.  For the next few years he lived in Almaty, Kazakhstan, and then returned to Dushanbe. Among his recent work is music for feature movies. Nazarov is of the Pamiri ethnic group and many of his songs are in Shughni language.

Filmography

Yunosti pervoe utro, composer, (1979)
Kumir, composer and actor, (1988)
Tonnel, composer, (1993)
Luna Papa, composer, (1999), Moon Father
Rozhdenstvenskaya mysteriya, composer, (2000), The Christmas Miracle
England, composer, (2000)
Statue of Love, composer, (2003)
The Suit, composer, (2003), (The Suit, aka Shik – il vestito, Italy, aka Costume, Le, France)
Meistersinger: The sound of Russia, composer, (2003), (Big Bones – Big Business, aka Chasse à l'os en Sibérie, France)
Angel na dorogakh, composer, (2003), Angel on the Road
Die Sibirische Knochenjagd, composer, (2004)
Sex & Philosophy, composer and actor, (2005)
Shaere zobale-ha, composer, (2005), Poet of the wastes
Bobo, composer, (2008)
Opium War, composer, (2008)
The Man Who Came with the Snow, composer, (2009)
Mirror Without Reflection, composer, (2014)
The Teacher, composer, (2014)
Bunker, composer, (2019)

References

External links
Official Website

Some of his videos on youtube

1959 births
Living people
Pamiri people
20th-century Tajikistani male singers
Tajikistani actors
20th-century Tajikistani musicians
21st-century Tajikistani singers
20th-century Tajikistani actors
21st-century Tajikistani actors